Gaddaar may refer to:

 Gaddaar (1973 film), a Hindi language film 
 Gaddaar (1995 film), an Indian Bollywood film